Julien Ouedraogo (born February 16, 1982) is a Burkinabé sabre fencer. Ouedraogo made an official debut for his sporting discipline at the 2008 Summer Olympics in Beijing, where he competed in the individual sabre event. He lost the first preliminary match to France's Nicolas Lopez, with a score of 6–15.

References

External links
NBC Olympics Profile

Burkinabé male sabre fencers
Living people
Olympic fencers of Burkina Faso
Fencers at the 2008 Summer Olympics
1982 births
21st-century Burkinabé people